The Poynter Institute for Media Studies is a non-profit journalism school and research organization in St. Petersburg, Florida, United States. The school is the owner of the Tampa Bay Times newspaper and the International Fact-Checking Network. It also operates PolitiFact.

History

Founding 
The school began on May 29, 1975, when Nelson Poynter, the owner and chairman of the St. Petersburg Times (now the Tampa Bay Times) and Times Publishing Company, announced that he planned to start a small journalism school called the Modern Media Institute. (The name of the school was changed to the Poynter Institute almost a decade later.)

In 1977, Nelson Poynter willed ownership of the Times Publishing Company to the Institute so that after his death the school would become the owner of the St. Petersburg Times. Poynter died on June 15, 1978, at the age of 74. He had become ill in his office just a few hours after he helped break ground for the new St. Petersburg campus of the University of South Florida.

At that point, the Institute began to grow into the larger school that exists today. The second president, Robert J. Haiman, moved the institute in 1985 to its current building.

Expansion and development 
Craig Newmark (founder of Craigslist) is a board member of the Poynter Foundation and donated $1 million to it in 2015. In 2015, Poynter received $382,997 from the Bill & Melinda Gates Foundation to influence news coverage of global health initiatives. In 2017, the Poynter Institute received $1.3 million from the Omidyar Network and the Open Society Foundations in order to support new projects in three main areas: fact-checking technology, impact tracking, and financial awards through innovation grants and crowdfunding matches.

In 2018, the Poynter Institute began a cooperation with the content recommendation network Revcontent, to stop misinformation and fake news in articles supplying Revcontent with fact-checking provided by their International Fact-checking Network. January 11, 2018, the Charles Koch Foundation's Director of Free Expression, Sarah Ruger, stated in an American Society of News Editors news release that "The foundation supports many grantees committed to press freedom, including The Poynter Institute, the Newseum and Techdirt's free speech initiative." On February 12, 2018, the Tampa Bay Times, the for-profit branch of the nonprofit Poynter institute spun off the Pulitzer Prize–winning PolitiFact website to form an independent division within Poynter. In March 2018, Google.org appointed Poynter Institute as the leader of their MediaWise program to equip middle and high school students to better differentiate online news and information. Google funded this with a $3 million grant.

Since 2019, The Washington Post has been partnering with the Poynter Institute to increase diversity in media, with the goal to expand Poynter's annual Leadership Academy for Diversity in Digital Media training journalists to become founders, top-level executives and innovators. Other sponsors are CNN, the Scripps Howard Foundations, Craig Newmark Philanthropies, the Ethics and Excellence in Journalism Foundation and TEGNA Foundation.

Poynter published a list of over 515 news websites that it labeled "unreliable" in 2019. The author of the piece used various fake news databases (including those curated by the Annenberg Public Policy Center, Merrimack College, PolitiFact, and Snopes) to compile the list and called on advertisers to "blacklist" the included sites. The list included conservative news websites such as the Washington Examiner, The Washington Free Beacon, and The Daily Signal as well as conspiracy outfits including InfoWars. After backlash from both readers of and contributors to some of the included publications, Poynter retracted the list, citing "weaknesses in the methodology". Poynter issued a statement, saying: "[w]e regret that we failed to ensure that the data was rigorous before publication, and apologize for the confusion and agitation caused by its publication." Reason pointed out that the author was a freelancer hired by the Institute who typically works for the Southern Poverty Law Center (SPLC). Reason drew parallels between the accuracy of the list with SPLC's own work on hate groups.

Election integrity and COVID-19 
In January 2020, having received funding from Facebook, the Poynter Institute was able to expand the MediaWise Programme with a national media literacy program called MediaWise Voter project (#MVP) to reach 2 million American first-time voter college students, helping them to be better prepared and informed for the 2020 elections.

The Poynter Institute received $737,400 in federal loans from the Paycheck Protection Program during the COVID-19 pandemic. President Neil Brown noted that this was not the first time the institute received government funding, noting past training contracts with Voice of America.

Organization

Funding 
As a 501(c)(3) nonprofit organization, Poynter receives funding from corporations, philanthropic organizations and government agencies. Major donors since 2015 include:

Poynter provides media training for media and communications organizations. Clients include the American Society of Business Publication Editors, Community Newspaper Holdings, Corporation for Public Broadcasting, Danish School of Media and Journalism, Google, Media24, National Public Radio, NBC News, Newsweek, Penske Media Corporation, Pinellas County School District, Raliance, Tegna, United States Agency for Global Media, University of South Florida St. Petersburg, USA Today, and the Washington Post.

Activities

News University 
News University (NewsU) is a project of the Poynter Institute that offers journalism training through methods including e-learning courses, webinars, and learning games. NewsU is funded by the John S. and James L. Knight Foundation.

International Fact-Checking Network 

In 2015, the institute launched the International Fact-Checking Network (IFCN), which sets a code of ethics for fact-checking organizations. The IFCN reviews fact-checkers for compliance with its code, and issues a certification to publishers who pass the audit. The certification lasts for one year, and fact-checkers must be re-examined annually to retain their certifications. Google, Facebook, and other technology companies use the IFCN's certification to vet publishers for fact-checking contracts.

The IFCN and the American Press Institute jointly publish Factually, a newsletter on fact-checking and journalism ethics.

Poynter Medal 
Since 2015, the Poynter Medal for Lifetime Achievement in Journalism has been awarded by the Poynter Institute. Winners include:

 2015: Bob Schieffer, former CBS News anchor and host of Face the Nation
 2016: Tom Brokaw, former anchor of NBC Nightly News
 2017: Judy Woodruff, anchor and managing editor of PBS NewsHour
 2018: Lester Holt, anchor of NBC Nightly News and Dateline NBC
 2019: Katie Couric, broadcast journalist, author and media entrepreneur
 2020: Chris Wallace, anchor of Fox News Sunday
 2021: Lesley Stahl, correspondent for CBS News' 60 Minutes

See also 

 Roy Peter Clark
 Donald K. Fry
 Kelly McBride

References

External links 
 
 NewsU.org official site
 International Fact-Checking Network (IFCN)

1975 establishments in Florida
American journalism organizations
Education in St. Petersburg, Florida
Educational institutions established in 1975
Fact-checking websites
Journalism schools in the United States
Tampa Bay Times
Universities and colleges accredited by the Council on Occupational Education
501(c)(3) organizations